The Egypt–Libya border is 1,115 km (693 mi) in length and runs from the Mediterranean Sea in the north to the tripoint with Sudan in the south.

Description
The border starts in the north on the Mediterranean coast at the Gulf of Sallum. It then proceeds overland roughly southwards via series of irregular lines that frequently veer south-west or south-east, before reaching the 25th meridian east. The border then follows this meridian south down to the Sudanese tripoint on Gabal El Uweinat. Only the northern littoral section of the boundary contains any significant population centres, with the vast majority of the frontier running through remote areas of the Sahara desert, including the Great Sand Sea and Libyan desert.

History
Egypt, though nominally part of the Ottoman Empire, had acquired a large degree of autonomy under Muhammad Ali following the Second Egyptian-Ottoman War of 1839–41. In 1882 the British occupied Egypt, effectively establishing a protectorate (formally declared only in 1914). The Ottoman Empire had also nominally ruled the coastal areas of what is today Libya since the 16th century, organised into the Vilayet of Tripolitania, with a vaguely defined border between the Vilayet and Egypt based on an 1841 Ottoman firman, which placed the border further to the east than its current position.

In September 1911 Italy invaded Tripolitania, and the Treaty of Ouchy was signed the following year by which the Ottomans formally ceded sovereignty of the area over to Italy. Italy organised the newly conquered regions into the colonies of Italian Cyrenaica and Italian Tripolitania and gradually began pushing further south; in 1934 they united the two territories into Italian Libya.

Egypt achieved full independence in 1922. The border became a point of contention - for example, Egypt rejected a secret Anglo-Italian treaty of 1915 which had ceded the Al Jaghbub Oasis to Italian Libya. Egypt and Italy signed a treaty on 6 December 1925 which finalised the border at its current position (though Egypt did not formally ratify the treaty until 1932–3). The northern section of the border was delimited in more detail in 1926–7, with the boundary then being demarcated on the ground by a series of pillars. Further on-the-ground demarcation occurred in 1937–8, which resulted in some minor modifications. Meanwhile, Italy, in attempt to control the Senussi rebels, had constructed a fence along much of the frontier in the 1920s-30s.

During the North African Campaign of the Second World War Italy was defeated and its African colonies were occupied by the Allied powers, with Libya split into British and French zones of occupation. Libya was later granted full independence on 2 December 1951. During this period Egypt occasionally pressed for a modification of the border, stating that it should shift westwards to the 24th meridian east, with Al Jaghbub and Bardiyah to be included within Egypt. These claims appear to have been abandoned by the early 1950s.

Relations between the two states since then have largely been cordial, however tensions rose in the 1970s, due largely the more assertive pan-Arab and anti-Israel foreign policy of the Gadaffi government in Libya, which resulted in a brief war between the two countries along their northern border in 1977. Relations thereafter remained tense, but had largely normalised by the early 1990s. The border region has again become an area of concern as Egypt seeks to insulate itself from the effects of the ongoing civil war in Libya.

Settlements near the border

Egypt
 Sallum
 Sidi Umar
 Siwa Oasis

Libya
 Bardia
 Musaid
 Jaghbub

See also
 Egypt–Libya relations
 Frontier Wire (Libya)

References

 
Borders of Egypt
Borders of Libya
International borders